We Interrupt This Broadcast is an Australian sketch show produced by Helium for the Seven Network and premiered on 28 February 2023. The series aims at parodying worlds current popular and unpopular TV series’.

Episodes

References

Seven Network original programming
2023 Australian television series debuts
English-language television shows